The National Convention for Social Democracy (CNDS) is a political party in Chad.

History
The party nominated Adoum Moussa Seif as its candidate for the 1996 presidential elections; Seif finished seventh out of fifteen candidates with 3% of the vote. In the parliamentary elections the following year the party won one seat in the National Assembly. 

The CNDS supported incumbent President Idriss Déby in the 2001 presidential elections, and retained its single seat in the 2002 parliamentary elections.

It contested the 2011 parliamentary elections in an alliance with Action for Renewal of Chad, with the joint ticket winning one seat.

References

Political parties in Chad